Romerike Ravens is the women's handball team based in Rælingen, Romerike. The team plays in REMA 1000-ligaen, the top division in the country, since its promotion in 2020.

Since 2021 the women's elite handball team was renamed Romerike Ravens from the previous club name Rælingen HK.

Team

Current squad
Squad for the 2022–23 season

Goalkeepers
 1  Vilde Johansen
 12  Zaynap Elmrani
Wingers
RW
 2  Astrid Mjøen Holstad
 15  Silje Fjellengen
 77  Rikke Arnesen
LW 
 3  Marie Elde Selvaag
 10  Anniken Wollik
 23  Hanna Örtorp
Line players
 18  Kristin Dorthea Eskerud
 20  Maja Muri

Back players
 5  Bibi Aandewiel
 7  Lorin Sendi
 9  Frida Haug Hoel
 11  Isabella Jacobsen
 14  Sarah Deari Solheim
 21  Carina Berg
 22  Rikke Thorngaard
 28  Solveig Aashaug Stangvik

2023-2024 Transfers

Joining
   Marielle Daae Nordvang (LB) (from  Aker Topphåndball)
   Linnea Säreborn  (LB/CB) (from  Önnereds HK)

Leaving

Technical staff
 Head coach: Ane Mällberg
 Assistant coach: Michael O’Sullivan

Notable former National Team players
  Jeanette Nilsen

Notable former club players

  Åse Karin Johannessen (2002–2010)
  Tonje Rue Barkenes
  Andrea Ohrvik
  Ida Doornbos
  Sara Blankevoort 
  Marie Lindvik Jørstad
  Leila Laksiri
  Kathrine Hjelmeland
  Silje Arnesen
  Kine Sundby
  Lene Petterson Heiberg
  Andrea Hanssen
  Julie Bøe Jacobsen
  Rikke Skiri Østigård
  Marte Juuhl Svensson
  Emma Holtet
  Ida Ringlund Hansen
  Caroline Martins 
  Sisse Marie Bøge Fahlberg

References

Norwegian handball clubs
Handball clubs established in 1977
1977 establishments in Norway
Rælingen